Bojeong Station is a station of the Bundang Line; it is located in the train depot in the far northern end of Yongin, South Korea. It was built in order to relieve traffic congestion in the suburbs of Yongin, with the city bearing most of the construction costs. The current aboveground platform is non-operative; the new Bojeong Station, which opened in December 2011, is further south of the old terminal and underground.

References

Seoul Metropolitan Subway stations
Metro stations in Yongin
Railway stations opened in 2004